Currigan is a surname shared by several notable people:

 Martin D. Currigan (Ireland 1845–1900), local Irish-American politician in state of Colorado
 Thomas G. Currigan (living), local American politician in the state of Colorado; grandson of Martin D.
Currigan - player or person associated with Currie Rugby Football Club, Balerno, Midlothian.

See also
 Corrigan (disambiguation)
 Corrigan (surname)
 Korrigan (disambiguation)